MG Motor India Private Limited is an automobile manufacturer in India, a subsidiary of Shanghai-based Chinese automotive manufacturer SAIC Motor which markets vehicles under the British MG marque. The subsidiary was setup in the year 2017 and began its sales and manufacturing operations in 2019 with a facility in Halol, Gujarat. In January 2023 MG Motor India, in its attempt to support localization, decided to raise capital for funding its expansion in the country by tapping into Indian capital markets and reducing shareholding of parent organization SAIC.

A premium brand, MG cars are characterized by their build quality, safety features and industry leading technology.

Manufacturing facilities 
MG Motor India operates one manufacturing plant in the country, located in Halol, Gujarat. The plant has a capacity of 80,000 units per year and was previously owned by General Motors India, which halted its sales operations in India at the end of 2017.
 MG Motor India has invested more than  crore in revamping the 178 acre facility after its takeover from General Motors.

Like in other regions globally, most MG cars manufactured and sold in India are designed primarily in London and/or Shanghai by SAIC SMTC and SAIC-GM-Wuling.

Models

ICE vehicles

Electric vehicles

While MG Hector is essentially a rebadged Baojun 530 SUV designed by SGMW (SAIC-General Motors-Wuling), MG Gloster is a rebadged Maxus D90 SUV designed for the Indian market.
MG ZS EV and MG Astor ZS are true MG cars designed in London by SMTC.

BRIT Dynamic 
The BRIT Dynamic badge on a MG car is a conformity of the British Automobile Standard carried over from original MG sports cars and signifies high quality of engineering, performance and reliability. BRIT Dynamic engines are jointly developed and engineered by SAIC SMTC and General Motors.
It was introduced in India first with MG Gloster in 2020 and subsequently with the Astor in November 2021. The badge is conferred above the front wheel arches on either side of top of the line Turbo Automatic (Torque Converter) trims only.

Advertising 
In March 2019, MG Motor India appointed Benedict Cumberbatch as the brand ambassador of the company. The company made its Indian adverting debut with its advertisement for the MG Hector SUV, which carried the tagline, "India's first internet SUV" and "It's a human Thing".

See also 

 MG Motor
 SAIC Motor
 MG Motor UK

References

External links 
 

India
Vehicle manufacturing companies established in 2017
Manufacturing companies based in Gurgaon
Indian subsidiaries of foreign companies
SAIC Motor
SAIC Motor divisions and subsidiaries
SAIC Motor joint ventures
Car manufacturers of India
2017 establishments in Haryana